SS Santa Rita was a refrigerated cargo ship built for the United States Maritime Commission by Federal Shipbuilding of Kearny, New Jersey in 1941. The explosion destroyed the engines; opened a  hole in the hull of the ship, which immediately flooded the No. 3 cargo hold; and killed one officer and two men. After ten minutes, the ship's master, Henry Stephenson, ordered the ship abandoned; most of the surviving officers and crew and the ship's two passengers had already boarded the Nos. 3 and 4 lifeboats.

When the boat did not immediately sink, U-172 fired machine gun bursts at the vessel to discourage her crew from returning. The U-boat got off four quick shots with her deck gun that struck Santa Ritas superstructure, but did not finish off the ship. After taking Stephenson prisoner aboard the submarine, crewmen from U-172 boarded the still-floating Santa Rita and searched the ship for two hours, finally emerging with some scavenged food. After seven more shots from the deck gun were fired, Santa Rita rolled over on an even keel and sank at 15:20 near position . American destroyers  and  rescued most of the survivors and landed them at Port of Spain, Trinidad, while another boat rescued the rest and took them to Puerto Rico. Stephenson was repatriated to the United States in February 1945.

Notes

References 
 

 

Type C2-G ships
Ships built in Kearny, New Jersey
1941 ships
World War II merchant ships of the United States
Ships sunk by German submarines in World War II
World War II shipwrecks in the Atlantic Ocean
Maritime incidents in July 1942